Nor Butania, is a neighbourhood in the Erebuni District of Yerevan, Armenia.

References 

Populated places in Yerevan